In mathematics, the finite-dimensional representations of the complex classical Lie groups 
can be constructed using the general representation theory of semisimple Lie algebras. The groups 
In the classification of simple Lie algebras, the corresponding algebras are 

However, since the complex classical Lie groups are linear groups, their representations are tensor representations. Each irreducible representation is labelled by a Young diagram, which encodes its structure and properties.

General linear group, special linear group and unitary group

Weyl's construction of tensor representations

Let  be the defining representation of the general linear group . (If  then .) We write .

The dimensions of these irreducible representations are
 
where  is the hook length of the cell  in the Young diagram . 
 The second formula for the dimension is sometimes called Stanley's hook content formula.

Examples of tensor representations:

General irreducible representations 

If , we can associate to  the pair of Young tableaux . This shows that irreducible representations of  can be labeled by pairs of Young tableaux . Let us denote  the irreducible representation of  corresponding to the pair  or equivalently to the sequence . With these notations,

 

 

 The dimension of   where  is 
 where . See  for an interpretation as a product of n-dependent factors divided by products of hook lengths.

Case of the special linear group 

In particular, irreducible representations of  can be indexed by Young tableaux, and are all tensor representations (not mixed).

Case of the unitary group 

The correspondence preserves irreducibility.

Tensor products 

Calling  the number of lines in a tableau, if , then 

where the natural integers  are 
Littlewood-Richardson coefficients.

Below are a few examples of such tensor products:

Orthogonal group and special orthogonal group 

In addition to the Lie group representations described here, the orthogonal group  and special orthogonal group  have spin representations, which are projective representations of these groups, i.e. representations of their universal covering groups.

Construction of representations 

The irreducible representation  that corresponds to such a diagram is a subrepresentation of the corresponding  representation . For example, in the case of symmetric tensors,

Case of the special orthogonal group 

 For  even,  is still irreducible as an  representation if , but it reduces to a sum of two inequivalent  representations if .

For example, the irreducible representations of  correspond to Young diagrams of the types .

Dimensions 

There is also an expression as a factorized polynomial in : 

where  are respectively row lengths, column lengths and hook lengths. In particular, antisymmetric representations have the same dimensions as their  counterparts, but symmetric representations do not,

Tensor products 

Beyond the stable range, the tensor product multiplicities become -dependent modifications of the Newell-Littlewood numbers.

Branching rules from the general linear group 

The decomposition of a tensor representation is given in terms of Littlewood-Richardson coefficients  by the Littlewood restriction rule 

where  is a partition into even integers. The rule is valid in the stable range . The generalization to mixed tensor representations is 

Similar branching rules can be written for the symplectic group.

Symplectic group

Representations 

The finite-dimensional irreducible representations of the symplectic group  are parametrized by Young diagrams with at most  rows. The dimension of the corresponding representation is  

There is also an expression as a factorized polynomial in :

Tensor products 

Just like in the case of the orthogonal group, tensor product multiplicities are given by Newell-Littlewood numbers in the stable range, and modifications thereof beyond the stable range.

External links 

 Lie online service, an online interface to the Lie software.

References 

Representation theory of Lie groups
Lie groups